A fire rake is a wildland fire fighting tool. A fire rake has a wooden or fiberglass handle with a rake head consisting of four to six sharp, serrated, triangular steel blades. It is used to rake a fire break with the sharp teeth, enabling it to reach fire in undergrowth in addition to loose surface debris. A McLeod, which is sometimes called a rake hoe, is a similar tool whose rake portion looks more like a steel rake but with sharp edges on the teeth. The teeth of the more traditional fire rake which resemble the teeth of a great white shark allow it to penetrate deeper into the undergrowth when necessary. The preference for one implement over the other is somewhat subjective.

A fire fighter will rake burning material back into the (black) area already burned, moving the fire away from the fuel ahead of it to create a fire break. The burning material is left to burn itself out away from the edge of the fire line, or another fire fighter with a fire flapper will smother it if required. The tool will cut through any undergrowth that may be burning and overturn some soil, further assisting in creating a fire break, thus smothering fire. This can reduce the temperature of burning materials below their threshold of ignition.

See also 
 Pulaski (tool)

Wildfire suppression equipment
Forestry tools